The E. W. Bliss Company is a manufacturer of machine tools founded by Eliphalet Williams Bliss. The company was based in Brooklyn, New York and is now based in Hastings, Michigan as BCN Technical Services. BCN is owned by Schuler Group.

History
In 1857, Bliss formed a partnership with John Mays. Under the name of Mays & Bliss, they engaged in the machine press and die business. In 1871, Mays sold his share of the business to Bliss' cousin, J. H. Williams. Bliss later bought Williams' interest and conducted the business by himself. In 1885, Eliphalet Williams Bliss, Anna M. Bliss, and William A. Porter, Frank M. Leavitt and Charles L. Hart incorporated the business with a capital of $100,000.00 divided into 4,000 shares of $25.00 each. In 1890, the company was incorporated with a capital of $1,250,000, which was afterwards increased to $2,000,000. The company increased its holdings by buying out the business of the Stiles & Parker Press Company and the U. S. Projectile Company.

  E. W. Bliss at one time was owned by American corporation Gulf + Western before it was consolidated into Bliss Clearing Niagara.

In December 1947, after 90 years, the Brooklyn plant was closed. Manufacturing facilities were then moved to Englewood, New Jersey, Hastings, Michigan, Toledo, Ohio, Canton, Ohio and Salem, Ohio. Bliss purchased Consolidated Press Company of Hastings, Michigan. The Hastings, Michigan plant is the last remaining company facility, now called BCN Technical Services.

In 1906, E. W. Bliss Company created the Bliss Automobile.

In the 1960's E. W. Bliss owned an engineering development facility in Swathmore, PA. The products included design of a continuous casting machine for Phoenix Steel, worked on development of automated airport landing system and aircraft arresting gear for commercial and military airframes (a pendant and net systems). The company maintained a test facility at the Woodbine, NJ airfield where they installed the largest steam launch catapult of its time.

Products
The company produced a line of special presses adapted for sheet metal work, power stamping machines, automobile parts, torpedoes, shrapnel and armor-piercing projectiles. Notable among these products were the Whitehead torpedo, the Bliss-Leavitt torpedo and the Bliss automobile.

Bliss obtained defense contracts for the manufacture of torpedoes, used by the US Navy, and munitions during the Spanish–American War, World War I and World War II.

Bliss machines were often huge and very heavy, powered by steam and were sold or used by the company itself to manufacture pressed metal products. These machine tools sported names such as "Automatic Muck Bar Shear", "Gang-Slitting Machine", "Double Seamer for Flat Bottoms Machine", "Double Crank Press", "Double Eccentric Press, Geared", "Reducing Press" and "Power Press No 18 on Short Legs".

References

1885 establishments in New York (state)
Defense companies of the United States
Manufacturing companies based in Michigan
Manufacturing companies based in New York (state)
Manufacturing companies established in 1885